Step It Up can refer to:
 Step It Up (song)
 Step It Up 2007, U.S. global warming campaign
"Step It Up", a song by American drag queen RuPaul featuring Dave Audé from her 2015 album Realness.